Mohamed Shaffaz is a Maldivian footballer, who is currently playing for JJ Sports Club.

International career
On 3 June 2004, Shaffaz made his debut for Maldives against Oman in a friendly match, replacing Ibrahim Amil in the 4-1 loss, for the complete second half. He started his first game for Maldives in a 3-0 loss to Oman, on 31 May 2004, playing the full 90 minutes.

References

External links
 
 

1982 births
Living people
Maldivian footballers
Maldives international footballers
Association football defenders
Association football midfielders
Association football utility players
T.C. Sports Club players